The Roman Catholic Diocese of Santo Amaro is a diocese located in the district of Santo Amaro, in the city and the Ecclesiastical province of São Paulo in Brazil.

History
 15 March 1989: Established as Diocese of Santo Amaro from the Metropolitan Archdiocese of São Paulo

Bishops
 Bishops of Santo Amaro (Roman rite)
 Bishop Fernando Antônio Figueiredo, O.F.M. (March 15, 1989 – 2015.12.2)
 Bishop Giuseppe Negri, P.I.M.E. (2015.12.2 – present)

Coadjutor bishop
Giuseppe (José) Negri, P.I.M.E. (2014–2015)

Auxiliary bishop
Luciano Bergamin, C.R.L. (2000–2002), appointed Bishop of Nova Iguaçu

Other priest of this diocese who became bishop
José Aparecido Gonçalves de Almeida, appointed Auxiliary Bishop of Brasília in 2013

References
 GCatholic.org
 Catholic Hierarchy
  Diocese website (Portuguese)
 Diocese Facebook

Roman Catholic dioceses in Brazil
Christian organizations established in 1989
Santo Amaro, Roman Catholic Diocese of
Roman Catholic dioceses and prelatures established in the 20th century